Telepathe (pronounced telepathy and meant with some literal meaning) are an electronic pop duo from Brooklyn consisting of core members Busy Gangnes and Melissa Livaudais. The band also includes other occasional musicians, such as Ryan Lucero.

Telepathe has toured with the Strokes' frontman Julian Casablancas, in addition to friend DJ Diplo, Ladytron and The Faint. Their 2009 debut album, Dance Mother, was produced by TV on the Radio's David Sitek.

Discography
Studio albums
 Dance Mother (2009)
 Destroyer (2015)

EPs
 Farewell Forest EP (2006)
 Sinister Militia EP (2007)
 Chrome's On It EP (2008)

Singles
 "Throw Away This / Destroyer" (2011)

Remixes
 TV on the Radio - "Crying" (2008)
 Dan le sac vs Scroobius Pip - "Cauliflower" (2010)
 Scott Hardkiss - "You & I" (2010)
 Planningtorock - "The Breaks" (2011)

References

External links
 Telepathe on MySpace Music
 
 Interview with Elle magazine
 IAMSOUND Website Biography

American experimental musical groups
American synth-pop groups
American experimental rock groups
Female musical duos
Rock music duos
American pop music duos
Electronic music duos
American women in electronic music
Musical groups from Brooklyn
Electronic music groups from New York (state)
Musical groups established in 2009
Iamsound Records artists